Massumeh Farhad is an American curator, art historian, and author. She is the Chief Curator and Curator of Islamic Art at the Freer Gallery of Art and Arthur M. Sackler Gallery at the Smithsonian Institution National Museum of Asian Art. She is known for her work with Persian 17th-century manuscripts.

Biography 
Farhad has a PhD (1987) in art history from Harvard University. In 1997, she had been in a relationship with the Chief Curator of the National Museum of African Art, Philip L. Ravenhill (1945–1997) before his death.

She has contributed to the Encyclopaedia Iranica. Farhad has curated numerous exhibitions including the "Art of the Persian Courts" (1996), "The Heroic Past: The Persian Book of Kings" (2000), "Fountains of Light: The Nuhad Es-Said Collection of Metalwork" (2000), "Antoin Sevruguin and the Persian Image" (2001), "The Adventures of Hamza" (2002), "Style and Status: Imperial Costumes From Ottoman Turkey" (2005), "Facing East: Portraits from Asia" (2006), "Falnama: The Book of Omens" (2009), and "The Art of Qur’an: Treasures from the Museum of Turkish and Islamic Art" (2016–2017).

Publications

See also 
 Women in the art history field

References 

Living people
Date of birth missing (living people)
American curators
Women art historians
American art historians
Harvard University alumni
Smithsonian Institution people
American Iranologists
American Turkologists
American Islamic studies scholars
Year of birth missing (living people)